Questi pazzi, pazzi italiani is a 1965 Italian "musicarello" film directed by Tullio Piacentini.

Plot 
The film takes place in Ferrari, Italy about two young pizza chefs named Mario and Luigi that traverse all around the town looking for a lost violin. Throughout the film, they meet characters that assist them on the journey leading them throughout town realizing that despite the loss of their violin, they find themselves and who they really are.

Cast
Fred Bongusto
Beppe Cardile
Gigliola Cinquetti
Petula Clark as Herself
Nicola Di Bari
Peppino Di Capri
Sergio Endrigo
Paolo Ferrara
Antonietta Fiorito as Storyteller (voice)
Ricky Gianco
Enzo Jannacci
Roberto Murolo
Diego Peano
Pino Presti
Tony Rossi
Nini Rosso
Edoardo Vianello
Henry Wright

External links
 

1965 films
1960s Italian-language films
1965 musical comedy films
Musicarelli
1960s Italian films